Audea tegulata is a moth of the family Erebidae. It is found in Botswana, the Democratic Republic of Congo (East Kasai, Orientale, Katanga), Kenya, Malawi, Namibia, Nigeria, South Africa, Tanzania, Zambia and Zimbabwe.

References

Moths described in 1902
Audea
Moths of Africa